The IIFA Diva Award is chosen by the viewers and was given on behalf of Samsung and then IDEA later on.

Winners
The winners are listed below-

See also 
 IIFA Awards
 Bollywood
 Cinema of India

External links 
Official site
International Indian Film Academy Awards